Magic Malta is a music radio station in Malta operated by Public Broadcasting Services, the Maltese government's public broadcaster. This station gives a big importance to music and caters to most ages. Music varies from current hits to those 1970s, 1980s, 1990s memories. Local talent is also featured on Magic Malta.

Recently, Magic Malta went through a refresh which brought shows such as Carlo's Breakfast Café, Arthur's Drive, etc... 
News bulletins on Magic Malta are provided by the BBC at 08:00. 09:00, 12:00, 17:00 and 18:00 daily.

External links

References 

Radio stations in Malta
Radio stations established in 2003